Uraan is a Pakistani television series, produced and directed by Zulfiqar Haider. It features Nimra Khan, Ali Josh and Kiran Tabeir in lead roles.

Cast
Nimra Khan as Husna
Ali Josh as Ali Kazmi
Kiran Tabeir as Mina aka Tamanna
Saba Faisal as Shameem
Munazzah Arif as Naheed Begum
Zia Khan as Abdul Qadir Khan
Raheela Agha as Shaista
Salman Faisal as Billo
Sameer Khan as Rafay Khan
Anjum Habibi as Abdul Majeed
Mehreen Shah as Qurat-ul-Ain aka Ainee
Imran Ahmed as Majid
Zafar Abbas as Shafiq
Danish Ahmed as Waqar Ahmed aka Vicky
Ahmed Sufian as Sheharyar
Bilal Nadeem as Bilal
Zahid Qureshi as Inspector Sajid
Humayun Fazal as Daadu
Waseem Ahmed

Controversy
In November 2021, Munazzah Arif revealed about non-payment of her project which she did in 2019. She posted on her Instagram account, “The play Uraan was aired on Aplus in 2019 and my work has not been paid till date”. Few days later, Nimra Khan also complained about non-payment of her  drama from same producer for same play. She also took the issue to Instagram and wrote, "He (Zulfiqar Haider) is saying I am not giving your money straight away".

References

External links 

2019 Pakistani television series debuts
Pakistani drama television series
Urdu-language television shows
2019 Pakistani television series endings